Shadow of the Eagle may refer to:

 Shadow of the Eagle (1950 film), a British film
 Shadow of the Eagle (2005 film), a Finnish film

See also
 The Shadow of the Eagle, a 1932 Mascot film serial